Hugh Wilson Scott (18 December 1927 – 17 April 2018) was an Irish first-class cricketer.

Scott was born at Belfast and educated in the city at Belfast Technical High School. Playing club cricket for Cliftonville in Belfast, Scott made a single appearance in first-class cricket for Ireland against Scotland in 1958 at Alloway. Wilson wasn't required to bat in the match and bowled five wicket-less overs of medium pace. He also played three minor matches for Ireland in 1958; playing once against Worcestershire and twice against the touring New Zealanders. Following Cliftonville's league relegation at the end of the 1950s, Scott joined Woodvale. Outside of cricket he worked as an accounts manager. He died at Belfast in April 2018.

References

External links

1927 births
2018 deaths
Cricketers from Belfast
Irish cricketers